A Munro is any Scottish mountain with a height over 3000 feet (914.4 metres).

Munro may also refer to:

Geography
 Munro, Buenos Aires, a neighborhood in the province of Buenos Aires, Argentina
 Hamilton/John C. Munro International Airport, an airport in Hamilton, Ontario, Canada
 Mount Munro, a peak on Cape Barren Island in Tasmania, Australia
 Munro Township, Michigan, United States

People with the name
 Munro (surname), people with the surname Munro
 Clan Munro, a Highland Scottish clan
 Donnie Munro, the former lead singer of the band Runrig

Other uses
 Munro (film), an Academy-Award-winning animated short film, released in 1961
 Munro Day, holiday celebrated each year on the first Friday in February by Dalhousie University
 Munro Mark 1 EV, an electric 4x4 first revealed as a prototype based the Foers Ibex
 USCGC Douglas Munro (WHEC-724), a High Endurance Cutter of the US Coast Guard
 USCGC Munro (WMSL-755), Legend-class cutter of the US Coast Guard

See also
 Monro (disambiguation)
 Monroe (disambiguation)
 Munroe (disambiguation)
 Murro